Trigonopterus sampunensis is a species of flightless weevil in the genus Trigonopterus from Indonesia.

The species is endemic to Sulawesi in Indonesia. The species was described in May 2019.

References

sampunensis
Beetles of Asia
Insects of Indonesia
Endemic fauna of Indonesia
Beetles described in 2019